RSI Rete Tre is the third Italian-language radio station from Radiotelevisione svizzera di lingua italiana (RSI), aimed at younger listeners broadcasting popular and alternative music. It was launched at 00:03 on 1 January 1988 and is available via FM mainly in the Italian-speaking cantons of Ticino and Graubünden. From 15 October 2009, its range was extended to major cities in German-speaking areas of Switzerland with the implementation of a number of DAB+ digital relays

On 1 January 2008, a party was held in the city centre of Lugano, beginning at 0:03, to celebrate the twentieth anniversary of the station, with a special song "We Are Rete Tre" (cover of the more famous "We Are the World").

In 2008, in Lugano, a large demonstration was organised for the twentieth anniversary of the station.

During Radioday 2010, RSI Rete Tre was awarded the title of "Swiss Radio of the Year", an award it previously won in 2008.

See also 
Radiotelevisione svizzera di lingua italiana
RSI Rete Uno
RSI Rete Due

Notes and references

External links 
Official site of RSI Rete Tre

Radio stations established in 1988
Italian-language radio stations in Switzerland